Living Lohan is an American reality television series that debuted on E!. It premiered on May 26, 2008 and ended on July 27, 2008, with a total of 9 episodes over the course of 1 season.

Synopsis
The program documents the daily lives of Lindsay Lohan's family, with most of the focus on her mother and manager Dina and younger sister Aliana's attempt to break into show business. Also appearing are brother Dakota "Cody" Lohan, grandmother Ann "Nana" Sullivan, who is Dina's mother and a former radio actress, and Jeremy Greene, a music producer helping Aliana with her debut album. Lindsay did not participate in the series.

According to Dina, the series did not air a second season because producers "wanted us to do these crazy things, like my son cheating on his girlfriend, me faking a pregnancy. I was like, 'No, no, no! They had ideas that weren't conducive to our ideas."

Critical reception
Gillian Flynn of Entertainment Weekly graded the show F and commented, "The irritation turned to repulsion around the first minute ... Dina snipes about the paparazzi's invasion of privacy, but thanks to her, there's not much left to invade."

Troy Patterson of Slate magazine said, "The show is crisply edited and tangily ironic without pushing its points too hard .... Living Lohan is not just a symptom of cultural decay but an active agent of it, commodifying the very youth and soul of Ali Lohan—younger sister of poor little Lindsay ... Living Lohan is one big exploitative mess."

Mark A. Perigard of the Boston Herald graded the show D and said, "Living Lohan scrapes the bottom of the stupidity barrel."

Brian Lowry of Variety said, "It's a tedious exercise, joining E!'s Keeping Up with the Kardashians in the realm of mother-daughter bonding experiences, with limited appeal beyond, perhaps appropriately, those pesky tabloids for which the featured "talent" profess disdain... The show at times provides unintended comedy, representing E!'s best hope of transforming Living Lohan into a guilty pleasure, if not for the reasons Dina (who doubles as a producer) would doubtless like... the most salient aspect of the series is that it's profoundly boring, wringing out sprinkles of drama as best it can."

While on Live with Regis and Kelly, Anderson Cooper bashed the show during the opening segment of the chat show. Kelly Ripa proceeds to show Cooper what the show is about. Video of Cooper's comments was placed in the "Top 20 Best Clips of the Year" by The Soup when he stated "I cannot believe I'm wasting a minute of my life watching these horrific people."

Episodes

Home releases
The show was released on DVD in Australia by Shock Records on March 28, 2009.

"All the Way Around"

"All the Way Around" is a single performed by American pop recording artist Aliana Lohan. The song was showing during the "Show Girls" episode, even though snippets of the song were played throughout the run of the series. It was released digitally on July 14, 2008. "All the Way Around" reached #75 on the Hot Digital Songs chart.

Background
The single, which was recorded in Las Vegas and Los Angeles, was produced by Emanuel "Eman" Kiriakou and written by Kara DioGuardi. This was the first single to be released through upstart Maloof Music and distributed through Interscope Records.

Charts

Release history

References

External links
 
 The Boulevard Magazine website
 Living Lohan Fan Site
 

2000s American reality television series
2008 American television series debuts
2008 American television series endings
Television series based on singers and musicians
E! original programming
English-language television shows
Lindsay Lohan
Television series by Bunim/Murray Productions
Television shows set in New York (state)